Hasan Sheykh (also Romanized as Ḩasan Sheykh) is a village in Qorqori Rural District, Qorqori District, Hirmand County, Sistan and Baluchestan Province, Iran. At the 2006 census, its population was 101, in 21 families.

References 

Populated places in Hirmand County